S. Ramesh  was an Indian politician. He was elected to the Karnataka Legislative Assembly, the lower house from the  Uttarahalli in Karnataka as a member of the Indian National Congress. Ramesh was also a film producer and was former Karnataka Film Chamber of Commerce President. He had also acted in the film 'Gokarna' produced by P Upendra. He had been a Minister in the Bangarappa government in 1990 and been a trade union leader. Ramesh started his career in the youth congress and was President of the Pradesh Youth Congress for a brief period. He unsuccessfully contested from Krishnaraja constituency of Mysore and M. K. Somashekar of Janata Dal (Secular) was victorious during 2004 Karnataka Legislative Assembly elections.

Positions held
Minister of Karnataka State Government
General Secretary, Karnataka Pradesh Youth
President, Karnataka Pradesh Youth Congress (I)
Member, Karnataka Pradesh Youth Congress (I) Poll Panel
President, Karnataka Slum Dwellers Congress
Member of Karnataka Legislative Assembly from Uttarahalli
President Bharath Electronics Limited, Employees Union
Advisor Escorts Ltd., Employees Union
President Stumpp Scheule & Somappa Ltd., Union
President Amco Batteries Employees Union
President Karnataka Rajiv Gandhi Auto Owners & Drivers Association
President Karnataka Film Chamber of Commerce
Vice Chairman International Film Festival
President Dasooha Trust Chamundi Hills
President Karnataka Film Chamber of Commerce.

Controversies

Gangaiah Murder
Ramesh had allegedly snatched a gun from his security guard Krishnappa and shot dead Gangaiah during clashes with Janata Dal supporters outside an inspection bungalow in Kunigal, Tumkur district. This happened during the assembly by-elections in the constituency in June 1992. Following the incident, an investigation was ordered by then Chief Minister Bangarappa, which gave a clean chit to Ramesh in its 'B' summary report to the Kunigal magistrate's court. Veerappa Moily, who took over as the chief minister in 1993 appointed retired judge M.S. Patil to inquire into the incident. In June 1995, Patil submitted his findings to the Government. In late February 1996, the Government tabled the report in legislature since such reports should be within eight months of submission. The report accused the police for clearing the minister of the murder charges and reiterated that Gangaiah had sustained the bullet injury as a result of the firing by Ramesh, which lead to his death. The report accused investigating officer G.K. Bekal "A cursory reading of the 'B' summary report would show that he (Bekal) played the role of a judge and virtually wrote a judgment of acquittal." Following the tabling of the report, Home Minister P.G.R. Sindhia announced that the Government would withdraw the 'B' report and launch criminal proceedings against Ramesh and Krishnappa based on the Patil committee findings. Both the two accused had sought anticipatory bail.

Death
He died of heart attack on 7-July-2006. He was survived by his wife, a son and a daughter. Then Chief Minister H. D. Kumaraswamy, Pradesh Congress Committee President Mallikarjun Kharge and other senior Congress leaders paid homage to the departed soul.

Filmography
He produced many movies in Kannada. Cheluva and Thandege Thakka Maga are some to mention. His wife Hemalatha Ramesh produced Kannada movie Ravivarma. He also acted in Gokarna movie with Upendra in lead role.

As actor
 Gokarna (2003)

As Producer
 Cheluva (1997)
 Ravivarma (1992) (Produced by his wife Hemalatha Ramesh)
 Ezhai Jaathi (1993) (Produced by his wife Hemalatha Ramesh)
 Thandege Thakka Maga (2006)

References

External links
 Official page

1954 births
2006 deaths
Politicians from Bangalore
Indian National Congress politicians from Karnataka
Karnataka MLAs 1989–1994
State cabinet ministers of Karnataka
Kannada people
Kannada people by occupation
Kannada actors